Nasim Akhtar may refer to:

 Nasim Akhtar Chaudhry, Pakistani politician
 Nasim Akhtar (professor) (born 1973), vice chancellor of Chandpur Science and Technology University
 Naseem Akhtar (footballer), Indian footballer